William Albert Yorzyk Jr. (May 29, 1933 – September 2, 2020) was an American competition swimmer, Olympic champion, and one-time world record-holder.

Yorzyk represented the United States at the 1956 Summer Olympics in Melbourne, Australia. He was the first swimmer to win the gold medal in the new 200-meter butterfly event, finishing with a time of 2:19.3 in the final.

Yorzyk continued to swim competitively while he attended medical school at the University of Toronto. Yorzyk served as a physician in the United States Air Force Medical Corps and was commissioned a captain. He won the U.S. AAU indoor championship in the 220-yard butterfly in 1958.  He was awarded the university's Bickle Prize as its outstanding student-athlete in 1958 and 1959.

Yorzyk was inducted into the International Swimming Hall of Fame as an "Honor Swimmer" in 1971.

William Yorzyk died on 2 September 2020, aged 87.

See also
 List of members of the International Swimming Hall of Fame
 List of Olympic medalists in swimming (men)
 List of Springfield University alumni

References

1933 births
2020 deaths
American male butterfly swimmers
American male freestyle swimmers
Olympic gold medalists for the United States in swimming
People from Northampton, Massachusetts
Swimmers from Massachusetts
Springfield Pride men's swimmers
University of Toronto alumni
Physicians from Massachusetts
American anesthesiologists
Military personnel from Massachusetts
United States Air Force Medical Corps officers
Swimmers at the 1955 Pan American Games
Swimmers at the 1956 Summer Olympics
Medalists at the 1956 Summer Olympics
Pan American Games gold medalists for the United States
Pan American Games medalists in swimming
Medalists at the 1955 Pan American Games
20th-century American people